Dosanjh Kalan is a village in Phillaur tehsil of Jalandhar District of Punjab State, India.

It is situated on Phagwara-Mukandpur road. The village is administrated by a Sarpanch who is the elected representative of the village.

Caste 
The village has population of 3883 and in the village most of the villagers are from schedule caste (SC) which has constitutes 45.66% of total population of the village and it doesn't have any Schedule Tribe (ST) population.

Education 
The village has a girls only upper primary with secondary/higher secondary Punjabi medium school which was founded in 1911. The school provide a mid-day meal as per the Indian Midday Meal Scheme. The village also has some private  co-ed schools such as:
G.H.R.K.S.C. School Dosanjh Kalan (upper primary with secondary/higher secondary, founded in 1932)
Guru Gobind Singh Model School (primary with upper primary)
Jyoti Model School (primary only)

Transport

Rail 

Air 

Notable people 
Diljit Dosanjh
Bannet Dosanjh 
Ujjal Dosanjh
Pinder

References 

Villages in Jalandhar district
Villages in Phillaur tehsil